Cucumis humifructus, the aardvark cucumber or aardvark pumpkin, is a kind of cucumber from southern Africa, tropical Africa, and Madagascar which fruits underground. It is a prostrate vine up to seven meters (22 feet) in length. It is reliant on the aardvark to eat the fruit in order to spread and re-bury the seeds of the plant. The species was described in 1927, with the name spelled C. humofructus, but this is corrected to C. humifructus following the International Code of Nomenclature for algae, fungi, and plants.

Description
Cucumis humifructus is thought to be the only Cucumis species having geocarpic (subterranean) fruit. The vines of the plant initially develop their fruits above ground on stalks which then bend and push back under the ground.
According to the PBS "Nature" television series, usually regarded as trustworthy, the cucumber is sometimes as deep as three feet (0.9 meters).
Most cucurbits have a single tendril at each node, but C. humifructus has 2 to 8, to give it the leverage needed to  bury the young fruit. It develops a tough skin which is water-resistant, and can remain intact for months without decay.

It is the only fruit (and only form of plant matter) eaten by aardvarks, which otherwise feed exclusively on ants and termites. Aardvarks eat the fruit for its water content, and propagate the seeds through their feces, which are then buried by the animals. Due to the depth at which the fruits ripen, the seeds are unable to germinate without assistance, and C. humifructus is completely reliant on aardvarks to uncover their fruit. This plant may be the reason why the aardvark is the only mammal feeding on ants and termites that has retained functional cheek teeth.

Distribution and habitat
It has a growing season of between three and four months, with its habitat being restricted to the savanna regions of tropical and southern Africa. It typically grows within the geographical range of aardvark burrows, as the animals tend to defecate near their lairs.

Gallery

References

humifructus
Tubers
Plants by morphology
Plants described in 1927